This is a list of Cayman Islands Twenty20 International cricketers

In April 2018, the ICC decided to grant full Twenty20 International (T20I) status to all its members. Therefore, all Twenty20 matches played between Cayman Islands and other ICC members after 1 January 2019 will have T20I status. The Cayman Islands will play their first matches with T20I status during the Americas Regional Qualifier Finals in August 2019.

This list comprises all members of the Cayman Islands cricket team who have played at least one T20I match. It is initially arranged in the order in which each player won his first Twenty20 cap. Where more than one player won his first Twenty20 cap in the same match, those players are listed alphabetically by surname.

Key

List of players
Statistics are correct as of 4 March 2023.

References 

Cayman Islands